Mündi is a village in Paide Parish, Järva County in northern-central Estonia, known for its manor.

References

Villages in Järva County
Kreis Jerwen